Verónica Pérez Fernández (born 21 June 1978), is a Spanish politician, general secretary of the PSOE of Seville and member of the Parliament of Andalusia since 2004.

Biography 
Born in San Juan de Aznalfarache, her relationship with the PSOE began at age 14 in the Socialist Youth, joining the PSOE at age 18.  Since then she has held various positions as Secretary of the Environment and Regional Planning of the PSOE -A in the period 2004–2008. Between 1999 and 2005 she was councilor of the City Council of San Juan de Aznalfarache and is also a provincial deputy since 2004. In the regional elections of 2004, she was elected deputy for the province of Seville in the Parliament of Andalusia, position that she renews in the elections of 2008, 2012 and 2015. In December 2013, she was elected secretary general of the PSOE of Seville in substitution of Susana Díaz when she assumed the presidency of the Junta de Andalucía and the general secretariat of the PSOE-A. Since 16 April 2015 she is the first secretary of the Andalusian Parliament.

PSOE's crisis 

On 29 September 2016, during the PSOE crisis of 2016 while she was the President of the Federal Committee of the national party, she starred in one of the most famous episodes on the door of the headquarters of the national party in Madrid where she pronounced the famous phrase: "At this moment, the only authority in the PSOE is me".

References

1978 births
Living people
Spanish Socialist Workers' Party politicians
21st-century Spanish women politicians
Members of the 7th Parliament of Andalusia
Members of the 8th Parliament of Andalusia
Members of the 9th Parliament of Andalusia
Members of the 10th Parliament of Andalusia
Members of the 11th Parliament of Andalusia